The Cacho Formation (E1C, Tpc, Tec) is a geological formation of the Altiplano Cundiboyacense, Eastern Ranges of the Colombian Andes.

Definition 
The formation was first described by Hubach in 1931 and 1957 and named by Campbell in 1962 and Julivert in 1963.

Description

Lithologies 
The Cacho Formation consists of white, yellow and reddish fine to coarse cross-bedded sandstones in thick banks intercalated with reddish and grey shales.

Stratigraphy and depositional environment 
The age has been estimated to be Late Paleocene, based on paleoflora studied by Thomas van der Hammen in 1957. The formation is laterally equivalent to the Lower Socha and Barco Formations.

Outcrops 

The Cacho Formation is apart from its type locality in Soacha, found in the Eastern Hills of Bogotá, and many other locations in the Eastern Ranges up until the south of Boyacá. The synclinals of the Río Frío, Checua-Lenguazaque, Sesquilé, Sisga, Subachoque, Teusacá, Siecha, and the anticlinal of Guatavita are composed of the Cacho Formation.

See also 

 Geology of the Eastern Hills
 Geology of the Ocetá Páramo
 Geology of the Altiplano Cundiboyacense

References

Bibliography

Maps

External links 
 

Geologic formations of Colombia
Paleogene Colombia
Paleocene Series of South America
Riochican
Itaboraian
Peligran
Sandstone formations
Formations
Geography of Cundinamarca Department
Geography of Bogotá
Geography of Boyacá Department